Marcel Barthel (born 8 July 1990) is a German professional wrestler currently signed to WWE, where he performs on the SmackDown brand under the ring name Ludwig Kaiser. He is a member of Imperium.

Before coming to WWE, Barthel wrestled primarily in his native Germany under the ring name Axel Dieter Jr, most notably for Westside Xtreme Wrestling (wXw).  He also wrestled in the United Kingdom for Progress Wrestling. In wXw, Dieter was a two-time World Tag Team Champion and a one-time Unified World Wrestling Champion.

Professional wrestling career

Westside Xtreme Wrestling (2009–2017) 

Dieter made his debut for Westside Xtreme Wrestling (wXw) in January 2009, losing to Dan Marshall. Dieter's next match in wXw wouldn't be until July 2012, when he and Da Mack defeated Walter and Michael Isotov. Dieter and Da Mack would go on to form a regular team, dubbing themselves Hot And Spicy. On 16 November 2013, they defeated The Autsiders (Walter and Robert Dreissker) to win the wXw World Tag Team Championship. Dieter and Da Mack made 7 successful defences of the championship, defeating the likes of The Sumerian Death Squad (Tommy End and Michael Dante), Forever Hooligans (Rocky Romero and Alex Koslov) and Kazuki Hashimoto and Ryuichi Kawakami. They eventually lost the championships to Matt Striker and Trent on 15 March 2014, but won the championships back in a rematch one day later. On 6 April 2014, Dieter received his first opportunity at the wXw Shotgun Championship, losing to Axel Tischer. After over a combined year as wXw World Tag Team Champions, Dieter and Da Mack were defeated by French Flavour (Lucas Di Leo and Peter Fischer) on 18 October 2014, bringing their reign to an end. On 22 November, he unsuccessfully challenged Walter for the wXw Unified World Wrestling Championship. In February 2015, Dieter took part in the Four Nations Cup, defeating Timothy Thatcher in the final to win the tournament. In March, Dieter took part in the 16 Carat Gold Tournament, defeating Zack Sabre Jr. in the semi-final to advance to the final, where he lost to Tommy End. In October, after a short break, Hot And Spicy teamed together once again, taking part in the 2015 World Tag Team Tournament, making it to the semi-finals where they lost to reDRagon (Kyle O'Reilly and Bobby Fish). In March 2016, Dieter once again took part in the 16 Carat Gold Tournament, defeating Drew Galloway in the semi-final to advance to the final, where he lost to Zack Sabre Jr, the man he defeated to advance to the final in the previous year's tournament. On 2 September, Dieter and Da Mack faced off against each other, with Da Mack coming out on top and retaining his wXw Shotgun Championship. In late 2016, Dieter joined Ringkampf, and on 10 December, he defeated Marty Scurll to win the wXw Unified World Wrestling Title. Dieter held the championship until March 2017, when he was defeated by Jurn Simmons. In April, Dieter announced that he would be leaving wXw to pursue further opportunities outside of Germany. On 30 April, wXw held a farewell show for Dieter, titled "wXw Die Matte Ist Heilig: Farewell To Axel Dieter Jr". In his final match, he teamed with Ringkampf stablemate Walter to defeat longtime partner Da Mack and longtime rival Jurn Simmons.

On 30 October 2018, it was confirmed that Barthel, under the Axel Dieter Jr name, will return to wXw as a part of their 18th Anniversary Show on 22 December.

Progress Wrestling (2017) 

Representing wXw and Ringkampf, Dieter made his debut for Progress Wrestling in the United Kingdom on 15 January 2017, alongside Walter, defeating The London Riots (James Davis and Rob Lynch). They returned to the promotion on 29 January 2017, losing to The South Pacific Power Trip (TK Cooper and Travis Banks). They once again returned on 19 March, defeating The Hunter Brothers (Jim and Lee Hunter). In his first singles match, Dieter lost to Mark Haskins. On 23 April, Dieter, Walter and Timothy Thatcher unsuccessfully challenged British Strong Style (Pete Dunne, Trent Seven and Tyler Bate) in a six-man tag team match for all of British Strong Style's championships.

WWE (2017–present)

In 2017, after leaving wXw, Dieter signed with WWE, under his real name Marcel Barthel, where he was assigned to WWE's developmental territory that June, losing to Roderick Strong at a live event.

On the 8 August, 2018 episode of NXT, Barthel made his television debut, where he was defeated by Keith Lee. That December, Barthel would form a team with Fabian Aichner, where they would compete on both the NXT and NXT UK brands. They would later align themselves with Walter and Alexander Wolfe, forming the stable Imperium. On the 13 May, 2020 episode of NXT, Barthel and Aichner would defeat Matt Riddle and Timothy Thatcher, a substitute for Riddle's original partner Pete Dunne, winning the NXT Tag Team Championship. After successful title defenses against teams like Oney Lorcan and Danny Burch and The Undisputed Era, on the 26 August episode of NXT, Imperium would lose the titles to Tyler Breeze and Fandango, ending their reign at 105 days. 

On the 26 October, 2021 special episode of NXT: Halloween Havoc, Barthel and Aichner would defeat MSK in a Lumberjack match to win the NXT Tag Team Championship for the second time. On 5 December at NXT WarGames, they would successfully defend their titles against Kyle O'Reilly and Von Wagner. On 2 April 2022 at NXT Stand & Deliver, they would lose the titles back to MSK in a triple threat tag team match also involving The Creed Brothers, ending their reign at 158 days. Barthel's final NXT appearance was on the April 5 episode of NXT, when he and Aichner faced the Creed brothers in a losing effort, with Aichner walking out of their match.

On the April 8, 2022 episode of SmackDown, Barthel, under the new ring name Ludwig Kaiser, debuted with Gunther, accompanying him in his match against a local competitor. On the May 27, 2022 episode of SmackDown Kaiser had his first match on the main roster teaming with Gunther to defeat Drew Gulak and Intercontinental Champion Ricochet. A feud with the Brawling Brutes ensued for several months, which also resulted in two Intercontinental Champion matches between Gunther and Sheamus.

Other media 
Barthel made his video game debut as a playable character in WWE 2K22.

Championships and accomplishments 
Catch Wrestling Norddeutschland
Tag Team Tournament (2009) - with Da Mack
European Wrestling Promotion
EWP Tag Team Championship (1 time) – with Da Mack
Great Bear Promotions
Great Bear Grand Championship (1 time)
German Stampede Wrestling
GSW Tag Team Championship (1 time) – with Da Mack
Nordic Championship Wrestling
NFC First Fighter Championship (1 time)
International NCW Cruiserweight Championship (1 time)
First Fighter Tournament (2010)
Pro Wrestling Fighters
PWF North-European Championship (1 time)
Pro Wrestling Illustrated
Ranked No. 240 of the top 500 singles wrestlers in the PWI 500 in 2020
Westside Xtreme Wrestling
wXw Unified World Wrestling Championship (1 time)
wXw World Tag Team Championship (2 times) – with Da Mack
Mitteldeutschland Cup (2014)
Four Nations Cup (2015)
WWE
NXT Tag Team Championship (2 times) – with Fabian Aichner

References

External links 

 
 
 
 

1990 births
Living people
German male professional wrestlers
People from Pinneberg
NXT Tag Team Champions
21st-century professional wrestlers